Alternative for Changes (APN; , AZP) is a political party in Serbia representing the Albanian ethnic minority in Preševo Valley. It was founded in 2015, and it is currently led by Shqiprim Arifi, the president of the Preševo municipality.

Electoral results

Parliamentary elections

References 

Political parties of minorities in Serbia
Albanians in Serbia